Aron Kifle Teklu (born 20 February 1998) is an Eritrean long-distance runner. He  is the bronze medallist from the 2018 World Half Marathon Championships in Valencia. Aron is also the silver medallist in the 10000m from both the 2016 World U20 Championships and the 2019 All-African Games.

Biography

2015-2017
Kifle began competing internationally in 2015.  On 28 March, he raced in the U20 race at the 2015 World Cross Country Championships in Guiyang, China, placing 19th.  Aron finished 11th in his heat of the 5000m at the 2015 World Championships in Athletics, not qualifying for the final.  

In 2016, Kifle competed at the World U20 Championships and the 2016 Rio de Janeiro Olympic Games. On 11 July, Aron raced the Leiden Golden Spike 10000m in the Netherlands.  He won the race in 27:27.04.  On 19 July, Aron placed second in 27:26.20 in the 10000m at the IAAF World U20 Championships in Bydgoszcz, Poland.  On 23 July, Aron contested the 5000m at the IAAF World U20 Championships, placing 5th in 13:31.09.  

In 2017 Aron placed 5th at the World Cross Country Championships in Kampala, Uganda; the race was won by Kenya's Geoffrey Kamworor.  Aron competed in both the 10000m and 5000m at the 2017 London World Championships in Athletics.  In the 10000m, Aron placed 11th in 27:09.92.  The race was won by Great Britain's Mo Farah, who ran 26:49.51.  On 12 August Aron raced the 5000m placing 7th in 13:36.91, Ethiopia's Muktar Edris won the race.

2018-2020
On 10 February 2018, Aron won the Eritrean Half Marathon Championships in Massawa, Eritrea in a time of 1:01:08.  Aron represented Eritrea at the IAAF World Half Marathon Championships in Valencia, Spain, placing 3rd in 1:00:31.  Kenya's Geoffrey Kamworor won the race in 1:00:02 and Bahrain's Abraham Cheroben placed 2nd in 1:00:22.   On 21 October Aron placed 4th at the New Delhi Half Marathon in 59:51.

On 20 March 2019, Aron raced the World Cross Country Championships in Aarhus, Denmark.  Aron ran in the lead pack for much of the race finishing behind Joshua Cheptegei, Jacob Kiplimo, and Geoffrey Kamworor, respectively.   On 27 August Aron raced at the African Games in Rabat, where he finished 2nd in the 10000m in 27:57.79.  The first finisher was Ethiopia's Berehanu Tsegu; however, Berehanu tested positive for EPO and was disqualified.  On 6 October Aron raced the 10000m at the 2019 World Championships in Athletics in Doha, Qatar, placing 14th in 28:16.74; the race was won by Uganda's Joshua Cheptegei.  Aron then raced the Valencia Half Marathon on 27 October placing 5th  in 1:00:25.  

On 12 January 2020 Aron raced the 77th Cross Internacional Juan Muguerza in Elgiobar, Spain. Aron finished in 3rd position as the race was won by 17-year-old Ethiopia's Tadese Worku.  Aron Kifle was beaten by Kenya's Richard Yator in the final 200 metres to finish 3rd.

2021
On 21 March 2021, Aron won both the 5000m and 10000m at the ENAF Time Trial in Asmara, Eritrea in 14:12.59 and 29:17.14, respectively.  On 8 June, Aron raced at the Ethiopian Trials in Hengelo, Netherlands, placing 13th in 28:00.55; the race was won by Ethiopia's Selemon Barega.  Aron represented Eritrea at the 2020 Tokyo Olympic Games in the men's 10000m, where he placed 12th in 28:04.06. On 18 September in Asmara, Aron won the 5000m at the Eritrean championships in 14:11.57. On 17 October, Aron raced at the Barcelona Half Marathon, where he placed 4th in 1:00:53.  Next, Aron competed in cross country in Spain; on 14 November, Aron won the Cross de Atapuerca.  The next weekend on 21 November, Aron placed 4th at the Cross de Italica, while Rodrigue Kwizera who was second at Cross de Atapuerca won.

International competitions

Personal bests
Outdoor
5000 metres – 13:07.59 (Lausanne 2018)
10,000 metres – 27:09.92 (London 2017)
Half marathon – 59:51 (New Delhi 2018)

References

External links
 

1998 births
Living people
Eritrean male long-distance runners
World Athletics Championships athletes for Eritrea
Athletes (track and field) at the 2015 African Games
Place of birth missing (living people)
Athletes (track and field) at the 2016 Summer Olympics
Olympic athletes of Eritrea
Athletes (track and field) at the 2019 African Games
African Games medalists in athletics (track and field)
African Games silver medalists for Eritrea
Athletes (track and field) at the 2020 Summer Olympics